was a rural district in Miyagi Prefecture, in the Tōhoku region of northern Japan. 

The city of Higashimatsushima and much of the city of Ishinomaki were formerly part of this district, which was dissolved in 2005.

History
Under the Tokugawa shogunate, the district was within Mutsu Province and was under the control of the Date clan of Sendai Domain. In 1869, following the Meiji restoration, Mutsu Province was divided, with the area of Monou District becoming part of Rikuzen Province, and from 1872, part of Miyagi Prefecture. In the establishment of the modern municipalities system, the district was organized into fifteen villages (Miyato (宮戸村), Nobiru (野蒜村), Ono (小野村), Takagi (鷹来村), Kanomata (鹿又村), Fukaya (深谷村), Maeyachi (前谷地村), Nakatsuyama (中津山村), Monou (桃生町), Oyachi (大谷地村), Iinogawa (飯野川町), Hashiura (橋浦村), Futamata (二股村), Okawa (大川村), Jugohama (十五浜村)).

April 1, 1896: The village of Fukaura was abolished; villages of Oshio, Akai, Kita, Sue and Hirobuchi were established.
March 26, 1901: The village of Iinogawa was elevated to town status.
April 1, 1940: The village of Takagi was elevated to town status and renamed Yamoto (矢本町)
April 1, 1941: The village of Jugohama was elevated to town status and renamed Ogatsu (雄勝町)
April 1, 1951: The village of Shishiori was elevated to town status
March 11, 1955: Okawa, Oyachi and Futamata merge with Iinogawa to form the town of Kahoku (河北町)
March 11, 1955: The villages of Kanomata, Maeyachi, Kita, Sue, Hirobuchi merge to form the town of Kanan (河南町)
March 11, 1955: The villages of Monou and Nakatsuyama merge to form the town of Monou.
March 30, 1955: The village Hashiura and the village of Jusanhama from Motoyoshi District merge to form the village of Kitakami (北上村)
May 3, 1955: The villages of Miyato, Nobiru and Ono merge to form the town of Naruse (鳴瀬町)
May 3, 1955: The villages of Akai and Oshio merge with the town of Yamoto.
April 1, 1961: The village of Kitakami is elevated to town status.

 On April 1, 2005 - the towns of Yamoto and Naruse were merged to form the city of Higashimatsushima.
 On April 1, 2005 - the towns of Kahoku, Kanan, Kitakami, Monou, and Ogatsu were merged with the town of Oshika (from Oshika District) and Ishinomaki City to create a larger, new and expanded Ishinomaki City.

2005 disestablishments in Japan
Former districts of Miyagi Prefecture